K. J. Yesudas is an Indian playback singer who has sung over 9,000 songs in various languages. He sung 207 Hindi language film songs. The following is a complete list of his Hindi film and non-film songs:

film songs

1970s

1971

1974

1975

1976

1977

1978

1979

1980s

1980

1981

1982

1983

1984

1985

1986

1987

1988

1989

1990-present

References

External links
 

Hindi
Yesudas, K. J.